Eupeodes corollae is a very common European species of hoverfly. Males and females have different marking on the abdomen; males have square commas on tergites 3 and 4, whereas females have narrow commas. Larvae feed on aphids. This species has been used experimentally in glasshouses as a method of aphid control, and to control scale insects and aphids in fruit plantations. They were found to be partial to the fruit, eating more fruit than aphids.

E. corollae is found across Europe, North Africa and Asia. Adults are often migratory.

Technical description
External images
For terms see Morphology of Diptera
Wing length 5-8·25 mm. Male abdomen with pre-genital segment very large and conspicuous. Genitalia large. Yellow spots reach the side margin of tergites 3 and 4.Scutellum mainly yellow-haired. Female frons with white dust spots and junction between black ground colour and yellow spots straight.

Distribution
Palaearctic Range: from Fennoscandia South to Iberia, to the Mediterranean basin. Coastal States of Africa down to South Africa. Ireland East into European Russia, Russian Far East, Siberia, to the Pacific coast and Japan. China, Formosa. 
The male genitalia and the larva  are figured described by Dusek & Laska (1961)

Biology
Habitat: grassland, dune systems, dry river beds, garrigue, most sorts of farmland (including arable crops), suburban gardens, orchards, alpine grassland in the Alps. Hedgerows, grassy clearings in woodland, crops, gardens, tracksides, and road verges. Flowers visited include umbellifers, Achillea millefolium, Campanula rapunculoides, Chrysanthemum, Cirsium, Eschscholzia californica, Galeopsis, Hypericum, Leontodon, Origanum vulgare, Potentilla erecta, Ranunculus, Rubus fruticosus, Salix, Senecio, Tripleurospermum inodoratum, Tussilago.

The flight period is May to September (all the year in southern Europe). Information on the biology of Eupeodes corollae is provided by Marcos-Garcia (1981)  and Barkemeyer (1994).

References

Syrphini
Diptera of Africa
Diptera of Asia
Diptera of Europe
Insects described in 1794
Taxa named by Johan Christian Fabricius